"Courage (for Hugh MacLennan)" is a song by Canadian rock band The Tragically Hip. It was released in February 1993 as the third single from their 1992 album Fully Completely.  The song's bracketed title references  author Hugh MacLennan, because lines from his 1959 novel The Watch That Ends the Night are paraphrased in the song's final verse.

The song was very successful, reaching number 10 on Canada's RPM Singles Chart, and also charting well in the United States and the Netherlands. The song was nominated for "Single of the Year" at the 1994 Juno Awards. Between 1995 and 2016, "Courage" was the most played Tragically Hip song on rock radio stations in Canada.

Covers
In 1997, the song was covered by Sarah Polley for use in the film The Sweet Hereafter and its soundtrack. The cover version was also used in the television series Charmed. Singer-songwriter Justin Rutledge also covered the song for his 2014 album Daredevil, an album consisting entirely of Tragically Hip covers.

Charts

Weekly charts

Year-end charts

References

External links

Songs about writers
1992 songs
1993 singles
The Tragically Hip songs
MCA Records singles
Songs written by Rob Baker (guitarist)
Songs written by Gord Downie